Nimorazole (INN) is a nitroimidazole anti-infective. It is also being investigated for the treatment of head and neck cancer.

References 

Aromatase inhibitors
Nitroimidazole antibiotics
Antiprotozoal agents
4-Morpholinyl compunds